Parliamentary elections was held in Mauritania in September 2018; the first round took place on 1 September, with a second round held on 15 September. At the national level, elections were held in 157 constituencies, each electing one member to the National Assembly. Elections were also held in 13 regional councils and 219 municipalities.

As a result of the election, Union for Republic (UPR) remained the single largest party at the national level both in terms of popular vote and seats.

Electoral system
The 157 members of the National Assembly are elected by two methods; 113 are elected from single- or multi-member constituencies using either the two-round system or proportional representation; in single-member constituencies candidates require a majority of the vote to be elected in the first round and a plurality in the second round. In two-seat constituencies, voters vote for a party list (which must contain one man and one woman); if no list receives more than 50% of the vote in the first round, a second round is held, with the winning party taking both seats. In constituencies with three or more seats, closed list proportional representation is used, with seats allocated using the largest remainder method. For three-seat constituencies, party lists must include a female candidate in first or second on the list; for larger constituencies a zipper system is used, with alternate male and female candidates.

The other 40 seats are elected from a single nationwide constituency, also using closed list proportional representation, with half elected on separate lists reserved for women. A further four members are elected by the diaspora.

Preliminary results

Aftermath
After the election, 76 parties from both the presidential majority and opposition camps were dissolved for not obtaining more than 1% or not participating twice in two consecutive local elections, based on an election law passed the year before, with only 28 parties remaining in the political arena. Some of the dissolved parties include the first party founded after the establishment of multi-party politics, the Rally of Democracy and Unity, and the Movement of Reformation led by Kane Hamidou Baba.

Election for President of the Assembly
The election for President of the National Assembly took place on 8 October 2018, a week after its original scheduled date. Cheikh Ahmed Baye was elected president in the first round.

Footnotes

References

Elections in Mauritania
Mauritania
Parliamentary
Election and referendum articles with incomplete results